Enamul Haque (born 1 November 1985) is a retired Bangladeshi professional footballer who played as a striker. He last played for Brothers Union in the Bangladesh Premier League and the Bangladesh national football team.

Club career
Enamul started his career with Muktijoddha SKC in 2004. He got his career breakthrough with Farashganj SC during the 2008–2009 season by scoring 13 goals in 20 games. During the season he made headlines by scoring five goals against Khulna Abahani, as Farashganj won the game 7–0. His best season came during 2009–2010, with Abahani Limited Dhaka. He won the domestic double of the B.League and 2010 Federation Cup in his debut season with the club. That year he also became the first local player in Bangladesh Premier League history to finish the league season as the top-scorer, with his 21 goals. He was also the man of the match in the 2010 Federation Cup final. However, a knee injury in 2012, halted his career. He made a return to form during the 2014–15 Bangladesh Premier League season with 13 goals in about 20 matches for Muktijoddha SKC. Nonetheless, after suffering from continous injuries the following few years, he retired from football while playing for Brothers Union in 2019.

International career
On 26 April 2009, Enamul made his senior international debut against Cambodia at the 2010 AFC Challenge Cup qualifiers. He scored 4 goals at the 2009 SAFF Championship, and was the joint-top scorer in the tournament. In 2015, Bangladesh coach Lodewijk de Kruif recalled Enamul to the national team for the 2018 FIFA World Cup qualifiers, after the striker was out international football for half a decade due to a knee injury.

International Goals

Olympic Team

Senior Team

International Goals for clubs

Muktijoddha Sangsad KC

Abahani Limited Dhaka

Honours
Mohammedan SC
Federation Cup = 2008

Abahani Limited Dhaka
Bangladesh Premier League = 2009–10, 2012
Federation Cup = 2010
Bordoloi Trophy = 2010 

Sheikh Jamal DC
Bangladesh Premier League = 2010–11

Bangladesh
 South Asian Games Gold medal = 2010

Individual

 Bangladesh Premier League top scorer: 2009–10
 SAFF Championship top scorer: 2009

References

External links 
 

Living people
1985 births
People from Naogaon District
Bangladeshi footballers
Bangladesh international footballers
Farashganj SC players
Sheikh Jamal Dhanmondi Club players
Mohammedan SC (Dhaka) players
Abahani Limited (Dhaka) players
Muktijoddha Sangsad KC players
Association football forwards
Footballers at the 2010 Asian Games
Asian Games competitors for Bangladesh
Bangladesh Football Premier League players
South Asian Games gold medalists for Bangladesh
South Asian Games medalists in football